Armagh was a constituency used for the Northern Ireland Assembly.

The seat was first used for a Northern Ireland-only election for the Northern Ireland Assembly, 1973.  Members were then elected from the constituency to the 1975 Constitutional Convention and the 1982 Assembly.  After the Assembly dissolved in 1986, the constituency was not used again, its area being represented by parts of Newry and Armagh and Upper Bann.

It usually shared boundaries with the Armagh UK Parliament constituency, however the boundaries of the two constituencies were slightly different from 1983 to 1986 as the Assembly boundaries had not caught up with Parliamentary boundary changes.

For further details of the history and boundaries of the constituency, see Armagh (UK Parliament constituency).

Members

Note: The columns in this table are used only for presentational purposes, and no significance should be attached to the order of columns. For details of the order in which seats were won at each election, see the detailed results of that election.

Elections

1983 by-election

1982 Assembly Election

1975 Constitutional Convention

1973 Assembly Election

References

Constituencies of the Northern Ireland Assembly (historic)
Historic constituencies in County Armagh
1973 establishments in Northern Ireland
Constituencies established in 1973
1986 disestablishments in Northern Ireland
Constituencies disestablished in 1986